Rosta is a comune (municipality) in the Metropolitan City of Turin in the Italian region Piedmont, located about  west of Turin.

Sights include the Abbey of Sant'Antonio di Ranverso. It was part of the comune of Rivoli until 1694.

Twin towns — sister cities
Rosta is twinned with:

  Bojnice, Slovakia

References

Cities and towns in Piedmont